Dick Thompson (December 1930 – 1993) was a British Paralympic athlete who won six gold medals competing in track and field events. Thompson was most successful at the 1960 Summer Paralympics, winning three golds in the javelin events, a gold in the club throw, a bronze in the shot put, and two medals with the men's wheelchair basketball team.

Thompson married fellow Paralympian Diane Gubbin. He died in 1993, aged 62, at St Oswald's Hospice in Newcastle.

References

Medalists at the 1960 Summer Paralympics
Medalists at the 1964 Summer Paralympics
Medalists at the 1968 Summer Paralympics
Paralympic medalists in athletics (track and field)
Paralympic medalists in wheelchair basketball
Paralympic gold medalists for Great Britain
Paralympic silver medalists for Great Britain
Paralympic bronze medalists for Great Britain
Athletes (track and field) at the 1960 Summer Paralympics
Athletes (track and field) at the 1964 Summer Paralympics
Athletes (track and field) at the 1968 Summer Paralympics
Wheelchair basketball players at the 1960 Summer Paralympics
Wheelchair basketball players at the 1964 Summer Paralympics
Paralympic athletes of Great Britain
Paralympic wheelchair basketball players of Great Britain
British male javelin throwers
British male shot putters
Wheelchair javelin throwers
Wheelchair shot putters
Paralympic javelin throwers
Paralympic shot putters
1930 births
1993 deaths